1st Surrey Rifles F.C. was an amateur football club, open to members of the corps, who featured in the early years of the FA Cup from 1872 to 1878.  The first reported match played against external opposition was a 1-0 victory against the Lausanne club at the latter's Rosemary Branch ground in 1871.

The club's first Cup tie, in 1872-73, resulted in a 2-0 win over Upton Park F.C., in poor weather, the second goal coming near the close of play.  

The club did not win again in the competition until 1877-78, beating Forest School at Flodden Road in Camberwell.  The only goal came after "Allport, calling on his men for a sort of infantry charge, went bodily through the ranks of his enemies, and Kirkpatrick,taking advantage of an opportunity that presented itself, made a splendid long kick, and although Littlewood tried hard to turn aside the ball with his hand,it bounded off and went under the tape."  R. L. Allport, the club captain, had started the game in goal, but soon swapped out.

The club's second-round defeat to the Old Harrovians was its last in the competition; both Allport and John Maynard played in the club's first and last matches in the Cup.

Colours

The club's colours, according to the Charles Alcock annuals, were as follows:

1870-75: scarlet cap, blue jersey (with a gold bugle specified from 1872)
1875-76: red and black
1876-78: red & black cap, white shirt, white knickers, red & black stockings
1884-87: red & black

Notable players

W. J. (John) Maynard, who played in the first-ever official football international and earned two caps while with the Riflemen.

References

Association football clubs established in the 19th century
Surrey Rifles